The Woodbine Lincoln Highway and Brick Street Historic District is a nationally recognized historic district located in Woodbine, Iowa, United States.  It was listed on the National Register of Historic Places in 2013.  The route of the Lincoln Highway through Iowa was announced on September 14, 1913.  They chose what was known as the "Iowa Official Trans-Continental Route," which was already being used by transcontinental motorists through the state. It covered  of dirt and gravel roads that began in Clinton and traveled west to Council Bluffs.  The eleven block section through Woodbine follows what is now called Lincoln Way, the town's main thoroughfare.  This section of the Lincoln Highway was paved with bricks in 1921.  The street features a canopy of shade trees lined with houses from the turn of the 20th century.  Siebels' Department Store-Boyer Valley Bank, Woodbine Savings Bank, and the Woodbine Public Library are contributing properties in the historic district.

References

Woodbine, Iowa
Lincoln Highway
Buildings and structures in Harrison County, Iowa
National Register of Historic Places in Harrison County, Iowa
Historic districts on the National Register of Historic Places in Iowa